José Ángel Sepúlveda Badilla (30 November 1922 – 25 March 2009) was a Chilean footballer. He played in ten matches for the Chile national football team in 1946 and 1947. He was also part of Chile's squad for the 1946 South American Championship.

References

External links
 

1922 births
2009 deaths
Chilean footballers
Chile international footballers
Place of birth missing
Association football midfielders
Universidad de Chile footballers